Clarks Village is an outlet shopping village in Street, Somerset, England. It was established in 1993 on the site of old C&J Clark factory buildings.

History 
In the 19th century Cyrus Clark started a business in sheepskin rugs, later joined by his brother James, who introduced the production of woollen slippers, and later, boots and shoes. However, shoes are no longer manufactured there.

Clarks Village opened on 14 August 1993 and gained over two million visitors in its first year. It grew to include over 90 high street and designer retailers, as well as a number of coffee shops, restaurants and fast food chains. The site is owned and managed by Land Securities Group Plc. Each year the range of shops and brands available changes. Many family events take place during the year with activities and school holiday activities. Clarks Village selects a charity of the year to support and Somerset Rural Youth Project was its chosen charity for 2016.

Shops 

Asics
Barbour
Beauty Outlet
Bedeck
Ben Sherman
Boudavida
Cadbury
Caffè Mattia
Caffè Nero
Calvin Klein Underwear
Chapelle Jewellery
Claire's
Clarks
Cosmetics Company Store
Costa Coffee
Cotton Traders
Crew Clothing Company
Dartington Crystal
Denby
Dune London
ECCO
Ernest Jones
Farah
Fat Face
Fiorelli
Frankie & Benny's
French Connection
Gap Outlet
Gourmet Burger Kitchen
Grub's Up
Hallmark
Hamleys
Haribo
HMV
Hobbs
Holland & Barrett
Hotel Chocolat
Jack Wills
Jack Wolfskin
Jaeger
Jeff Banks
Joules
Lakeland
Le Creuset
Levi's
Lindt
M&S Outlet
Menkind
Mint Velvet
Molton Brown
Mountain Warehouse
Next Clearance
Original Penguin
Osprey London
Paperchase
Phase Eight
Picturehouse Cinemas
Pittards
Pizza Express
Portmeirion
Pret A Manger
Prezzo
ProCook
Racing Green
Radley London
Raging Bull
Roman
Samsonite
Saltrock
Seasalt Cornwall
Skechers
Sports Direct
Sugarhill Brighton
Suit Direct
Sunglass Hut
Superdry
Tefal
Tempur
The Body Shop
The Cornish Bakery
The North Face
The Perfume Shop
The Works Outlet
Thorntons
Timberland
TOG24
Trespass
Vans
Villeroy & Boch
Vodafone
Weird Fish
White Stuff
Wonderbra
Yankee Candle
Yumi

Gallery

References

External links
 Official website

Companies based in Somerset
Shopping centres in Somerset
Outlet malls in England
Buildings and structures in Mendip District
Street, Somerset